Jacqueline Boatswain (sometimes credited as Jacqui Boatswain)  is an English actress.

Career 
She is best known for playing headmistress Mrs Bassinger in the long-running BBC school drama, Grange Hill, from 2003–2006. The character's first name has never been revealed, but according to the sign outside her head teacher's office it starts with "S". Mrs Bassinger was not seen during the 2007 series, her function in the programme taken over by Cathy Tyson as deputy head, Miss Gayle. It was not known if Boatswain would return to Grange Hill, however the show has now been cancelled. In addition to Grange Hill, Boatswain has appeared in Casualty, and as a police custody sergeant in the BBC daytime drama Doctors. She also has extensive stage experience. In October 2013, she appeared in Sarah Rutherford's Adult Supervision at Park Theatre (London).

She has also appeared in Life on Mars and The Royal. In 2013, she joined the cast of popular Channel 4 comedy drama series, Shameless, for the final ever series playing Patreesha St. Rose. She also played Eileen the Crow in the 2015 video game Bloodborne. Boatswain joined the cast of Channel 4 soap opera, Hollyoaks as regular cast member, Simone Loveday on 20 February 2015. Hollyoaks aired a Come Dine with Me special week to celebrate their twentieth anniversary, with Boatswain as one of the cast members hosting. Boatswain left Hollyoaks in late 2018 with her exit airing on 23 January 2019. In 2018, she also played a role as Monique in the BBC Drama Collateral. In 2020, Boatswain appeared in the BBC TV series Shakespeare & Hathaway: Private Investigators in episode 3.6 "Reputation, Reputation, Reputation!" as Odette Dixon. Then in October 2021, she appeared in an episode of the BBC soap opera Doctors as Heather Derby.

Filmography

Film

Television

Video games

References

External links
 

Living people
British television actresses
British soap opera actresses
Black British actresses
English people of Saint Lucian descent
English soap opera actresses
People from Bedford
Actresses from Bedfordshire
Year of birth missing (living people)